Dhaani (Urdu: دھانی, literal English translation: "light green") was the fourth album by the Pakistani pop band Strings, released in 2003. Singles from the album were "Mera Bichara Yaar", "Soniyae", "Chaaye Chaaye", "Pal", "Bolo Bolo", "Dhaani", "Najane Kyun", "Hai Koi Hum Jaisa" and "Kahani Mohabbat Ki".

Dhaani by Strings was Pakistan's 1st Record-Breaking Album with 8 Videos And 5 Awards. Qirat Hamed covered their song Mera Bichra Yaar.

Concept
Dhaani means light green. It has come from a word called 'Dhaan' that is the outer covering of a raw grain of rice (kacha chawal ka daana). The green color of that grain is called dhaani.

Dhaani, the first song of the album is a blend of Faisal's groovy voice and Bilal Maqsood's guitars. Next in line is "Najane Kyun". It's a soft number, which gives the signature sound of Strings followed by "Kahany Mohabat ki" and "Mera Bichara Howa Yaar". Sohniye", a unique and extremely jumpy number, is a treat to listen to. "Bolo Bolo" features Hariharan and 'Pal' featuring Sagarika has excellent background music and lyrics. "Chaaye Chaaye" is the liveliest.

According to Bilal, Dhaani is directly related to nature if you closely go through its lyrics. The lyrics have many references to nature such as in the title track one constantly hears words like badal (clouds), nadiya (rivers) and more. Also when the duo were composing the tunes in Murree for about a month they were more exposed to the exotic beauty of the Northern areas and that gave them the idea of having green patches and open skies on the album cover.

Track listing
All songs are written by Anwar Maqsood, those which are not are mentioned below.
All songs are composed by Bilal Maqsood.

Personnel
All information is taken from the CD.

Strings
 Faisal Kapadia: lead vocals
 Bilal Maqsood: vocals, lead guitar

Additional musicians
 Vocals: Hariharan (Bolo Bolo) & Sagarika daCosta (Pal)
 Guitars: Shuja Haider & Shallum Asher Xavier
 Violin: Suresh Lalwani
 Flute: Sajid & Baqir

Production
 Produced by Strings
 Drums & Keyboards sequenced by Shuja Haider & Faizi
 Mixing by Shahzad Hassan
 Recorded at Hill Music Studio by Ishaq Nazeer, High End Studios by Emad & Dixon and Post Station (Mumbai, India) by Vijay Benegal
 Album concept and design by Aamir Shah
 3D art by Adeel Butt

References

External links
Strings Online - Official Website

2003 albums
Urdu-language albums
Strings (band) albums